Haiti competed at the 1972 Summer Olympics in Munich, West Germany.  It was the first time in 12 years that the nation had sent athletes to the Olympic Games. Haiti's delegation consisted of seven competitors, all track and field athletes, and eight officials. One of the athletes, Elsie Baptiste, ended up not competing in any events. The only other woman on the team, Mireille Joseph, ran in the 100 metre race, becoming the first Haitian woman to compete in the Olympics. Among the delegation's officials were Lamartine Clermont, Franck Godefroy, Jacques Joachim, Philomene Joachim, Jules Merine, and Jean-M. Verly.

Results by event

Athletics

Men's 100 metres
Pierre-Richard Gaetjens
 Round 1 — 11.50 seconds (→ did not advance)

Men's 200 metres
 Gary Georges
 Round 1 — 22.97 seconds (→ did not advance)

Men's 400 metres
 Jean-Max Faustin
 Round 1 — 52.33 seconds (→ did not advance)

Men's 800 metres
 Fritz Pierre
 Round 1 — 2:01.5 (→ did not advance)

Men's 10000 metres
 Anilus Joseph
 Round 1 — did not finish (→ did not advance)

Men's marathon
 Maurice Charlotin — 3:29:21.0 (→ 62nd place, last finisher)

Women's 100 metres
 Mireille Joseph
 Round 1 — 13.84 (→ did not advance)

References
Official Olympic Reports

Nations at the 1972 Summer Olympics
1972 Summer Olympics
Summer Olympics